Outlaws of Pine Ridge is a 1942 American Western film directed by William Witney and starring Don 'Red' Barry, Lynn Merrick and Noah Beery.

The film's art direction was by Russell Kimball.

Cast
 Don 'Red' Barry as Chips Barrett  
 Lynn Merrick as Ann Hollister  
 Noah Beery as Honest John Hollister  
 Donald Kirke as Jeff Cardeen  
 Emmett Lynn as Jackpot McGraw  
 Francis Ford as Bartender  
 Clayton Moore as Lane Hollister  
 Stanley Price as Henchman Steve Mannion  
 George J. Lewis as Henchman Ross  
 Forrest Taylor as Sheriff Gibbons

References

Bibliography
  Len D. Martin. The Republic Pictures Checklist: Features, Serials, Cartoons, Short Subjects and Training Films of Republic Pictures Corporation, 1935-1959. McFarland, 1998.

External links
 

1942 films
1942 Western (genre) films
American Western (genre) films
Films directed by William Witney
Republic Pictures films
American black-and-white films
1940s English-language films
1940s American films